Władysław Horodecki (born Leszek Dezydery Horodecki; ; ;  — January 3, 1930) was a Polish architect active in the Russian Empire and later in the Second Polish Republic. He is best known for his contributions in the urban development of Kyiv, with buildings such as the House with Chimaeras, the St. Nicholas Roman Catholic Cathedral, the Karaite Kenesa, and the National Art Museum of Ukraine.

In Kyiv, Horodecki often worked along with a sculptor from Milan, Emilio Sala, who was an instructor at the Kyiv City College.

Biography

Russian Empire
Horodecki was born into a noble Polish szlachta family of the Kornic coat of arms in the village of Szołudki (Sholudky, now Mukhivtsi Rural Council, Nemyriv Raion, Vinnytsia Oblast, Ukraine). His ancestors were big landowners in the Podillia region. Horodecki graduated from the Imperial Academy of Arts in St. Petersburg in 1890, while prior to that he finished a realschule in Odesa. After 1890, Horodecki moved to Kyiv, where he lived for almost 30 years.

Poland
As Poland regained its independence after the Polish-Soviet War in 1920, and Russia, including Kyiv, fell under Bolshevism, he emigrated to Warsaw. In Poland, Horodecki headed an American Project Bureau, "Henry Ulan & Co." Some of his designs were built including a water tower and trade rows in Piotrków Trybunalski (today in Lodz Voivodeship), a meat factory in Lublin, a bath house in Zgierz, and a casino building in Otwock.

Persia

In 1928, on the invitation of the same company, Horodecki moved to Tehran, becoming a chief architect of the Syndicate on the Design of Persian Railways. He designed in particular the building of the Tehran railway station. In 1930 he died and was buried at Doulab Catholic Cemetery in Tehran. His epitaph is inscribed in Polish with only the phrase Profesor architektury. Niech mu obca ziemia będzie lekka., which translates into English as "Professor of architecture. Let the foreign earth be light for him."

Legacy
One of Kyiv's streets, designed by Horodecki, (between Maidan Nezalezhnosti and House with Chimaeras) was named after him in 1996 as vulytsia Arkhitektora Horodetskoho. The street had been called ulitsa Nikolayevskaya, and in Soviet times it was known as vulytsia Karla Marksa, after Karl Marx.

Works

References

External links

  Essay about Horodecki
  Biography of Horodecki

1863 births
1930 deaths
People from Vinnytsia Oblast
Ruthenian nobility
Architects from Kyiv
Hunters
Art Nouveau architects
Burials in Iran
Burials at Doulab Cemetery